Marinette Ngo Yetna (1965 – 24 May 2021) was a Cameroonian politician who served as a Deputy.

Early life and career 
Ngo Yetna Marinette was born on 19 December 1965 in Logbadjeck, a locality in the Sanaga-Maritime department in the Littoral region of Cameroon. Marinette has five brothers and sisters. She grew up in Edea and  completed  her secondary education in the Edea Governrment High School.

Marinette Yetna is an entrepreneur, founder and mananger of a company called Sotrapi Sarl and also owns the hotel Chez Marinette located in Kribi.

Political career 
Marinette Yetna was a member of the CPDM. In 2002 she was elected as the president of the Women organization of the CPDM party  for the Sanaga Maritime section and served as municipal councilor for the Edea municipality from 2002 to 2007. She joined parliament in 2013 following her election as a substitute senator in the 2013 senatorial elections of 14 April 2013.

In 2020, she was elected  as a deputy in the National Assembly during the 2020 Cameroonian parliamentary election.

References

1965 births
2021 deaths
Cameroonian women
Cameroon People's Democratic Movement politicians
People from Littoral Region (Cameroon)